The Sydney Stadium was a sporting and entertainment venue in Sydney, New South Wales, which formerly stood on the corner of New South Head Road and Neild Avenue, Rushcutters Bay. Built in 1908, it was demolished in 1970 to make way for the construction of the Eastern Suburbs Railway.

History 

Sydney Stadium was built in 1908 on the site of a former Chinese market garden that was leased by boxing promoter Hugh Donald Macintosh as a venue for sporting events.

Macintosh originally built a temporary open-air stadium to promote a World heavyweight boxing championship title fight between Canadian world heavyweight champion Tommy Burns and Australian champion Bill "Boshter" Squires on 24 August 1908, which Burns won by a knockout in the 13th Round. It also hosted the biggest sporting event in Australia's history up till then, where over 20,000 crammed in the stadium on 26 December 1908 to see Tommy Burns fight the African-American Jack Johnson. This fight captivated the world because it was the first time that a 'black' man fought for the prestigious World Heavyweight Boxing Championship, with Johnson winning to take the title.

In 1912 an octagonal structure, with a roof, was built to a design by Thomas Pollard Sampson. The new venue had raked wooden seats facing the central stage and could accommodate as many as 12,000 people. It was mainly used as a venue for boxing matches until the mid-1900s.

The Old Tin Shed 
From 1954 onwards and through the 1960s, the stadium was frequently used to host concerts by visiting overseas performers – notably the groundbreaking "The Big Show" package tours promoted by expatriate American entrepreneur Lee Gordon – as it was the only large-capacity indoor venue in Sydney at that time. It colloquially became known by performers as "The Old Tin Shed" and was so big that American star Bob Hope purportedly said it was "like Texas with a roof on it".

The stadium hosted many major Australian, New Zealand, British and United States stars.

 
Sydney Stadium was demolished in 1970 to make way for the construction of the Eastern Suburbs Railway. The location of the former site is commemorated by a plaque at the edge of the Weigall sporting field, the sports fields of Sydney Grammar and the Sydney Grammar Edgecliff Preparatory School.

Exhibition 
The Museum of Sydney held a major exhibition about the history of the Sydney Stadium. The exhibition started on 22 September 2012 and finished on 10 March 2013. It looked at the origins of the Stadium as well as the fights, performers, wrestling, fans and Roller derby among other topics.

References

External links 
 Aerial view of Sydney Stadium in 1964

Defunct boxing venues
Demolished buildings and structures in Sydney
Former buildings and structures in Sydney
Music venues in Sydney
Sports venues in Sydney
Boxing venues in Australia
Rushcutters Bay, New South Wales